Paavo Salminen (19 November 1911 – 27 April 1989) was a Finnish footballer. He competed in the men's tournament at the 1936 Summer Olympics. He spent his club career playing for Helsingin Toverit.

References

External links

1911 births
1989 deaths
Finnish footballers
Finland international footballers
Olympic footballers of Finland
Footballers at the 1936 Summer Olympics
Footballers from Helsinki
Association football goalkeepers